Daphna Poznanski-Benhamou (born 3 June 1950) is a French politician who represented the Eighth constituency for French residents overseas on the National Assembly from 2012 to 2013.

Early life 
She was born in Oran in Algeria, and fled to Marseille with her mother after the Algerian War.

References 

1950 births
21st-century French politicians
21st-century French women politicians
Deputies of the 14th National Assembly of the French Fifth Republic

Socialist Party (France) politicians
French people of Algerian descent
People from Oran
People of the Algerian War
Women members of the National Assembly (France)
Living people